This is a list of listed buildings in the parish of West Kilbride in North Ayrshire, Scotland.

List 

|}

Key

See also 
 List of listed buildings in North Ayrshire

Notes

References
 All entries, addresses and coordinates are based on data from Historic Scotland. This data falls under the Open Government Licence

West Kilbride